Teresa Banham, also known and credited as Theresa Banham (born 1964) is a British television and theatre actress perhaps best known for playing the role of the Broadfell Prison Governor in the first part of the Doctor Who Christmas special, "The End of Time" and the role of Rebecca on the television show Robin Hood. In 2012, she appeared as Sor Sebastiana in the original Royal Shakespeare Company production of Helen Edmundson's The Heresy of Love.

Banham was born in Surrey.

Filmography

References

External links

Living people
1964 births
Actresses from Surrey
English television actresses
English film actresses
English stage actresses
People educated at Parsons Mead School